Dil Ne Phir Yaad Kiya may refer to:
 Dil Ne Phir Yaad Kiya (1966 film), a Bollywood film
 Dil Ne Phir Yaad Kiya (2001 film), a Hindi-language film